Ali Sadiq Nasser Al-Hassan (born 4 March 1997) is a Saudi Arabian footballer who plays as a midfielder for Saudi Pro League side Al-Nassr.

Personal life
Ali is the brother of the player Abbas Al-Hassan.

Career

Al-Fateh
Al-Hassan started his career at Al-Fateh and is a product of the Al-Fateh's youth system. On 17 February 2018, Al-Hassan made his professional debut for Al-Fateh against Al-Ittihad in the Pro League, replacing Abdelkader Oueslati. On 6 March 2018, Al-Hassan scored his first goal for the club in the 5–2 win against Al-Batin. He went on to make 5 appearances and score once in his first season with the first team.

On 20 November 2018, Al-Hassan underwent surgery in Germany and was sidelined for a month. He made his return on 21 December 2018 in the league match against Al-Ettifaq. On 5 January 2019, Al-Hassan signed a 5-year professional contract with Al-Fateh. In his second season as a first-team player, Al-Hassan made 16 appearances and scored once against Al-Fayha.

Al-Nassr
On 5 October 2020, Al-Hassan joined Al-Nassr on a five-year contract for a reported fee of SAR25 million.

Career statistics

Club

International
Statistics accurate as of match played 30 November 2022.

International goals
Scores and results list Saudi Arabia's goal tally first.

Honours

Club
Al-Nassr
Saudi Super Cup: 2020

References

External links
 

1997 births
Living people
Saudi Arabian footballers
Association football midfielders
Saudi Professional League players
Al-Fateh SC players
Al Nassr FC players
People from Al-Hasa
Saudi Arabian Shia Muslims
Saudi Arabia international footballers
Olympic footballers of Saudi Arabia
Footballers at the 2020 Summer Olympics
2022 FIFA World Cup players